Barbara O'Connor (born November 9, 1950) is an American author of children's books.

O'Connor was born and grew up in Greenville, SC. She lived in Duxbury, Massachusetts for 26 years, but now resides in Asheville, North Carolina.

Her books have won awards including the Parents Choice Gold Award and being named ALA Notable Books. Her book How to Steal a Dog has been optioned for a film.

Bibliography

Novels
 Beethoven in Paradise, 1997
 Me and Rupert Goody, 1999
 Taking my life away, 6096
.are of Moses, 2004Moonpie and Ivy, 2004
 How to Steal a Dog, 2007
 Fame and Glory in Freedom, Georgia, 2003
 Greetings from Nowhere, 2008
 The Small Adventure of Popeye and Elvis, 2009
 The Fantastic Secret of Owen Jester, 2010
 On the Road to Mr. Mineo’s, 2012Wish, 2016Wonderland, 2018Halfway to Harmony, 2021

Biographies
 Mammolina: A Story about Maria Montessori, 1993
 Up in the Air: The Story of Bessie Coleman, 1996
 Barefoot Dancer: The Story of Isadora Duncan, Carolrhoda Books, 2002
 Katherine Dunham: Pioneer of Black Dance, 2002
 Leonardo Da Vinci: Renaissance Genius'', 2002

References

External links
 

1958 births
Living people
American women writers
People from Greenville, South Carolina
21st-century American women